Sahilan (also Romanized as Sahīlān; also known as Samīlān (Persian: سميلان) and Sehmīlān) is a village in Rudkhaneh Rural District, Rudkhaneh District, Rudan County, Hormozgan Province, Iran. At the 2006 census, its population was 50, in 10 families.

References 

Populated places in Rudan County